Darren Holden may refer to:

Darren Holden (footballer) (born 1993), English footballer
Darren Holden (musician) (born 1972), Irish musician